The Northern Cheyenne Tribe of the Northern Cheyenne Indian Reservation (formerly named the Tongue River) is the federally recognized Northern Cheyenne tribe. The tribal and government headquarters are located in Lame Deer, also the home of the annual Northern Cheyenne pow wow.

The reservation is bounded on the east by the Tongue River and on the west by the Crow Reservation. There are small parcels of non-contiguous off-reservation trust lands in Meade County, South Dakota, northeast of the city of Sturgis.

According to tribal enrollment figures as of March 2013, there were approximately 12,266 enrolled tribal members, of which about 6,012 were residing on the reservation, with approximately 91% of the population Native American (full or part blood quantum) and 72.8% identifying as Cheyenne. Slightly more than a quarter of the population five years or older spoke a language other than English. Members of the Crow Nation also live on the reservation.

Demographics 
Traditional Cheyenne spiritual culture, like most traditional Indigenous spiritual ways, values the peoples' connection to their landbase, and sees the land itself, as well as special sites like Bear Butte, as sacred. Numerous Cheyenne work as foresters and fire fighters. This spiritual perspective is evident in traditional communities like Lame Deer and Birney and when the 2006 vote on development coal and coalbed methane on the reservation split along modernist vs traditional lines.

A historical buffalo jump, burial sites of Cheyenne chiefs and spiritual leaders, the site of Custer's last camp before the Battle of the Little Bighorn, the Cheyenne Indian Museum, Ten Bears Gallery, St. Labre Indian School, and the Ashland Powwow are sites of special interest in the Ashland area.

The Northern Cheyenne are related to the Southern Cheyenne, who are located in Oklahoma. Following the Black Hills War and earlier conflicts in Colorado (see Sand Creek Massacre and Washita Massacre), the Northern Cheyenne were forcibly moved to Oklahoma and restricted to lands of their southern relatives. Unable to acclimate swiftly to the heat of western Oklahoma (Indian Territory at the time), having to grow their food instead of hunting or gathering as were their ways, and the brutal conditions in the barracks where they were held, the northerners quickly began dying. In desperation, a small band left the reservation and headed north in 1878, an odyssey that came to be known as the Northern Cheyenne Exodus.

The Northern Cheyenne briefly settled around Fort Keogh (Miles City, Montana). In the early 1880s, many families began to migrate south to the Tongue River watershed area and established homesteads in the northern edge of the Powder River Basin, which they considered their natural home. The Northern Cheyenne were allies of the Lakota in the Black Hills War of 1876–1877.

The boundaries originally did not include the Cheyenne who had homesteaded further east near the Tongue River, therefore those people who had were helped by the St. Labre Catholic Mission. Those Cheyenne who had homesteaded east of the Tongue River were relocated to reservation lands west of the river.

Communities and neighborhoods 

Lame Deer, Montana, with about 4,000 residents, of which 92% are American Indian, is the capital of the Northern Cheyenne nation. Chief Dull Knife College is located there. To the west is Muddy, Montana, with about 600 residents, 94% American Indian, and further west Busby, Montana, with about 700 residents, 90% American Indian. Busby was the site of the Tongue River Boarding School, opened in 1904. The school would later become quite active in basketball, with their team playing a winning game against the Harlem Globetrotters and winning a state championship in the 1950s. The Busby White River Cheyenne Mennonite Church is located in Busby. In 1976 the reservation had 2400 people and Marie Sanchez was the Chief Judge.

Ashland, Montana, is to the east. In 1884 a Catholic boarding school, the St. Labre Indian School, was established there. The 460 residents of Ashland are about 75% American Indian. They are also very active in basketball. When Busby became part of their district, they had notable rivalry basketball games in the late 1940s and on. Birney, Montana, population about 100, 86% Indian, is south of Lame Deer and Ashland. Part of Birney, "White Birney", lies south of the reservation.

Colstrip, Montana, is a neighboring industrial city devoted to coal mining and electrical generation. Located 20 miles north of the reservation, it has a population of about 2,300 residents, of which approximately 240, or 11%, are American Indians. It is also where some Cheyenne attend public school or live for work.

Major employers within the community that contribute to the economy on the reserve include St. Labre Indian School, power and construction companies, the federal and tribal governments, farming and ranching, small businesses, and the education system.

Education 
Chief Dull Knife College, originally named Dull Knife Memorial College, is an open admission Native American tribal community college and land grant institution. It is located on the reservation, in Lame Deer, and has a current enrollment of 141 students. On average, more than half of the graduates move on to four-year colleges. The college is accredited by the Northwest Commission on Colleges and Universities. It is member of the American Indian Higher Education Consortium and American Association of Community Colleges.

Northern Cheyenne Tribal School is the reservation's tribal school located in Busby, MT. 

The reservation is the recipient of a 2010 Promise Neighborhoods grant from the United States Department of Education, through the local Boys & Girls Clubs of America.

The St. Labre Catholic boarding school is also on the reserve and educates children in pre-K-12. It serves nearly 450 students and embraces the North American culture while also celebrating catholic faith and educating children. They integrate North American culture within the school curriculum allowing for formal education to take place in addition to cultural education. Along with the school, this facility also runs a Shiloh Youth Group Home, Childcare Center, Community Outreach Services, Elderly Outreach Services, and a Work Incentive Program. These programs along with the school aim to educate the community members ad provide them with skills in order to become independent in any way they need. There is also a St. Labre museum which houses important Cheyenne artifacts and aims to display history of the culture and language in hopes people with learn from it.

Notable Northern Cheyenne people

References

Sources 
 We, the Northern Cheyenne People
 Northern Cheyenne Reservation and Off-Reservation Trust Land, Montana/South Dakota United States Census Bureau

External links

 
 "Bringing the Story of the Cheyenne People to the Children of Today", Montana state curriculum, 218-page pdf

Northern Cheyenne Tribe
American Indian reservations in Montana
American Indian reservations in South Dakota
Buffalo jumps
Federally recognized tribes in the United States
Geography of Big Horn County, Montana
Geography of Meade County, South Dakota
Geography of Rosebud County, Montana
1884 establishments in Montana Territory